The 1974 New Zealand Royal Visit Honours were appointments by Elizabeth II to the Royal Victorian Order, to mark her visit to New Zealand that year. The Queen was accompanied by Prince Philip, Duke of Edinburgh, the Prince of Wales (now Charles III), Anne, Princess Royal and Mark Phillips on the tour, and attended the 10th British Commonwealth Games in Christchurch and celebrations at Waitangi to mark New Zealand Day. The honours were announced at the conclusion of the tour on 7 and 8 February 1974.

The recipients of honours are displayed here as they were styled before their new honour.

Royal Victorian Order

Knight Grand Cross (GCVO)
 Sir Denis Blundell  – governor-general of New Zealand

Knight Commander (KCVO)
 Patrick Jerad O'Dea

Commander (CVO)
 Bryan David Crompton

Member, fourth class (MVO)
 Desmond James Cummings 
 Lieutenant-Colonel Michael John Dudman – Royal New Zealand Infantry Regiment
 Donald Francis Ross
 Robert Samuel Straight 
 Lieutenant Kevin Frederick Wilson RNZN
 Francis Eamonn Wilson 

In 1984, Members of the Royal Victorian Order, fourth class, were redesignated as Lieutenants of the Royal Victorian Order (LVO).

Member, fifth class (MVO)
 Andrew George Berriman – superintendent, New Zealand Police Force
 Richard Butler
 Donald Claude Gordon
 Christine Ann Major
 Katherine Maclean Wood

Royal Victorian Medal

Silver (RVM)
 Raymond George Hawthorn
 Arthur Trevor Humphrey Broughton
 Sergeant Peter Forbes Orr – New Zealand Police Force

References

1974 awards
Royal Visit Honours
Monarchy in New Zealand